This is a list of media in Red Deer, Alberta.

Radio

Television
Until August 2009, Red Deer was served by a local television station, CHCA-TV channel 6, carrying programming from Canada's E! network. CHCA closed on August 31, 2009 due to economic troubles endured by its parent company, Canwest.

All of the city's other television services are rebroadcasters of stations from Edmonton. Red Deer is not designated as a mandatory market for digital television conversion.

Channel 4.1: CKEM-DT-1, Citytv 
Channel 8: CFRN-TV-6, CTV (analogue)
Channel 10.1: CITV-DT-1, Global 

After CHCA dropped its longtime affiliation with CBC Television in 2005, Edmonton's CBXT set up a rebroadcaster in Red Deer.  Radio-Canada outlet CBXFT already operated a rebroadcaster there, and both stations had been available for decades on cable in the city.  They were shut down with the CBC's other rebroadcasters in 2012, meaning Red Deer residents need cable to watch CBC and Radio-Canada programming.

Cable television in Red Deer is served by Shaw Communications, who operates a local community channel under the "Shaw TV" name. Discounting Shaw TV, Red Deer, with a population approaching 100,000, is one of the largest standalone urban centres in Canada (i.e. one that is not part of a larger metropolitan area) without a local TV station.

Newspapers
Red Deer Advocate
Red Deer Express has not existed in several years

Online News Media
 rdnewsNOW: Launched in 2016 as an evolution of 106.7 REWIND Radio and BIG 105.5 news. rdnewsNOW is an online short and long-form news outlet, and is part of the Jim Pattison Broadcast Group, sharing news resources with CHUB-FM and CFDV-FM. Slogan: Everything Red Deer
 Todayville: A digital local news platform launched by the former VP of CFRN-TV-6.

References

Red Deer
 
Media, Red Deer